Yevgeny Nikitin (born 9 April 1993) is a Belarusian professional football player currently playing for Sputnik Rechitsa.

References

External links
 
 
 Profile at Dinamo Minsk website

1993 births
Living people
Belarusian footballers
Association football midfielders
FC Bereza-2010 players
FC Dinamo Minsk players
FC Torpedo Minsk players
FC Sputnik Rechitsa players